Yevgeny Kafelnikov was the defending champion but lost in the semifinals to Albert Costa.

Costa won in the final 4–6, 7–6(7–2), 6–1, 6–0 against Félix Mantilla.

Seeds
A champion seed is indicated in bold while text in italics indicates the round in which that seed was eliminated.

  Yevgeny Kafelnikov (semifinals)
  Marcelo Ríos (first round)
  Marc Rosset (first round)
  Arnaud Boetsch (first round)
  Cédric Pioline (second round)
  Albert Costa (champion)
  MaliVai Washington (first round)
  Carlos Moyá (second round)

Draw

 NB: The Final was the best of 5 sets while all other rounds were the best of 3 sets.

Final

Section 1

Section 2

References
 1996 Rado Open Draw

Swiss Open (tennis)
1996 ATP Tour